Steve Goodman, known as Kode9 (born 1973) is a Scottish electronic music artist, DJ, and founder of the Hyperdub record label. He was one of the founding members of the early dubstep scene with his late collaborator The Spaceape. He has released four full-length albums: 2006's Memories of the Future and 2011's Black Sun (both with The Spaceape), Nothing (2015), Escapology and Astro-Darien (2022).

As owner of Hyperdub, Goodman has signed artists such as Burial, DJ Rashad, Zomby, and Fatima Al Qadiri. Goodman has a PhD in philosophy from the University of Warwick and has published a book, Sonic Warfare: Sound, Affect, and the Ecology of Fear, in 2009.

Early career
Initially inspired by what he calls the "hardcore continuum" of British dance music, Kode9 was formatively influenced by styles such as jungle, drum and bass and 2-step garage; he has mentioned his first encounter with jungle, in Edinburgh, as being "the most important musical event of my life". Other genres that are common influences in his work include dub, dancehall (such as toasting), and Indian music.  A move to Warwick and collaboration with the Cybernetic Culture Research Unit at University of Warwick studying rave culture, cybernetics, postmodernism and afrofuturism later led to a memetic philosophy regarding music, which he has spoken about at length in interviews. In the late nineties, Kode9 moved to London, and established a name as a disc jockey at clubnights such as FWD>>.

Current work
In 2004, Kode9 appeared on the second grime compilation on Rephlex records. That same year, Kode9 founded Hyperdub records; the first release was Sine of the Dub, a collaboration between Kode9 and Daddy Gee, which was a minimal, loose cover version of Prince's "Sign "O" the Times". Kode9 treated the vocals to fit his idea of their delivery by "a man on his deathbed". Subsequent releases established the label as an important and influential label within the dubstep genre. Hyperdub have since released records such as Burial's self-titled debut album, which The Wire magazine named their number one album of 2006.

Goodman has a PhD in philosophy from the University of Warwick and has also worked in academia.  As of 2006 he was working at the University of East London as a lecturer in media production, and course tutor for a master's program in sonic culture In December 2009, his Sonic Warfare: Sound, Affect, and the Ecology of Fear, a book exploring the uses of acoustic force and how it affects whole populations was published by MIT Press. The book also explores how sound can be deployed to set moods of dread and fear, how sound can be used as torture, as a weapon and as a threat.

Discography

Studio albums
Memories of the Future - Hyperdub, 2006 (with The Spaceape)
Black Sun - Hyperdub, 2011 (with The Spaceape)
Nothing - Hyperdub, 2015
Escapology - Hyperdub, 2022
Astro-Darien - Hyperdub, 2022

DJ mixes
DJ Kicks - Hyperdub, 2010
Rinse:22 - Rinse, 2013
Fabriclive 100 (with Burial) - Fabric London, 2018

See also
Hyperdub

References

External links
Hyperdub records
Kode9's Official Artist Facebook
Kode9's DJ-Kicks microsite
Discography at Discogs.com

Alumni of the University of Warwick
Academics of the University of East London
Scottish electronic musicians
Dubstep musicians
Post-dubstep musicians
Electronic dance music DJs
1973 births
Living people
Hyperdub artists